Hendrik Tui (born 13 December 1987) is a Japanese international rugby union player who currently plays as a loose forward for Suntory Sungoliath in the Top League. From 2015 he will represent the Queensland Reds in Super Rugby. He also plays the position of Wing.

Career

Born in New Zealand, Tui is of Samoan descent. He attended De La Salle College, Mangere East, Auckland before going onto university in Japan. Tui has made a name for himself in Japanese rugby, first with the Panasonic Wild Knights, and latterly with Suntory Sungoliath whom he joined in 2013. Some strong showings alongside ex-Wallaby international back-row forward George Smith brought him to the attention of Super Rugby franchise the Queensland Reds, and he was contracted to the Brisbane-based side for the 2015 Super Rugby season.

International

Tui made his international debut for Japan against  in June 2012 and to date has made 25 appearances for his national side and scored 11 tries.

References

1987 births
Japanese rugby union players
Japan international rugby union players
Japanese people of Samoan descent
New Zealand emigrants to Japan
Saitama Wild Knights players
Tokyo Sungoliath players
Rugby union flankers
Rugby union number eights
Living people
Queensland Reds players
Rugby union players from Auckland
Sunwolves players